The Canal du Loing is a 49.4 km long canal which connects the Seine at Saint-Mammès to the Briare Canal just north of Montargis, in central France. It runs through the Loiret and Seine-et-Marne départements.

History 
Philippe II, Duke of Orléans sought letters patent to build the canal in 1720, and it was completed in 1723. 3815 barges passed through in 1752 alone. Lock 20 is disused today, leaving 19 locks. The total fall is about 37m.

The canal is lateral to the river Loing except in two places where the river is used as part of the canal.

The Canal du Loing is part of the Bourbonnais route from Saint-Mammès on the Seine to Chalon-sur-Saône on the river Saône.

Current use 
The valley is wooded and pleasant throughout, with lakes resulting from former gravel pits. Commercial traffic has declined significantly, but the canal remains open all year round to accommodate barges, mostly carrying grain for export. The route is popular with private boats, and also sees some hire boats and hotel barges.

See also
 List of structures on the Canal du Loing

References

External links
 Structurae website translated
 Canal du Loing maps and details of places, ports and moorings on the canal, by the author of Inland Waterways of France, 8th ed., 2010, Imray
 Navigation details for 80 French rivers and canals (French waterways website section)

 
Loing
Canals opened in 1723
1723 establishments in France